Naloxone, sold under the brand name Narcan among others, is a medication used to reverse or reduce the effects of opioids. It is commonly used to counter decreased breathing in opioid overdose. Effects begin within two minutes when given intravenously, and within five minutes  when injected into a muscle. The medicine can also be administered by spraying it into a person's nose. Naloxone commonly blocks the effects of opioids for 30 to 90 minutes. Multiple doses may be required, as the duration of action of some opioids is greater than that of naloxone. Emergency medical services data from Massachusetts found that 93.5% of people given naloxone survived their overdose.

Administration to opioid-dependent individuals may cause symptoms of opioid withdrawal, including restlessness, agitation, nausea, vomiting, a fast heart rate, and sweating. To prevent this, small doses every few minutes can be given until the desired effect is reached. In those with previous heart disease or taking medications that negatively affect the heart, further heart problems have occurred. It appears to be safe in pregnancy, after having been given to a limited number of women. Naloxone is a non-selective and competitive opioid receptor antagonist. It works by reversing the depression of the central nervous system and respiratory system caused by opioids.

Naloxone was patented in 1961 and approved for opioid overdose in the United States in 1971. It is on the World Health Organization's List of Essential Medicines. Naloxone is available as a generic medication. In April 2021, the U.S. Food and Drug Administration (FDA) approved a higher dose naloxone hydrochloride nasal spray product (Kloxxado) intended to treat opioid overdose from fentanyl and its analogues, which are many times stronger than heroin.

Medical uses

Opioid overdose

Naloxone is useful in treating both acute opioid overdose and respiratory or mental depression due to opioids. Whether it is useful in those in cardiac arrest due to an opioid overdose is unclear.

It is included as a part of emergency overdose response kits distributed to heroin and other opioid drug users, and to emergency responders. This has been shown to reduce rates of deaths due to overdose. A prescription for naloxone is recommended if a person is on a high dose of opioid (>100mg of morphine equivalence/day), is prescribed any dose of opioid accompanied by a benzodiazepine, or is suspected or known to use opioids nonmedically. Prescribing naloxone should be accompanied by standard education that includes preventing, identifying, and responding to an overdose; rescue breathing; and calling emergency services.

Distribution of naloxone to individuals likely to encounter people who overdose is part of the harm reduction initiatives that have spread throughout the US and the world. This approach to dealing with substance use disorder is to treat it as a medical problem and focusing efforts on reducing the harm produced directly (e.g., overdose) and indirectly (exposure to infectious disease).

Clonidine overdose
Naloxone can also be used as an antidote in overdose of clonidine, a medication that lowers blood pressure. Clonidine overdoses are of special relevance for children, in whom even small doses can cause significant harm. However, there is controversy regarding naloxone's efficacy in treating the symptoms of clonidine overdose, namely slow heart rate, low blood pressure, and confusion/somnolence. Case reports that used doses of 0.1mg/kg (maximum of 2mg/dose) repeated every 1–2 minutes (10mg total dose) have shown inconsistent benefit. As the doses used throughout the literature vary, it is difficult to form a conclusion regarding the benefit of naloxone in this setting. The mechanism for naloxone's proposed benefit in clonidine overdose is unclear, but it has been suggested that endogenous opioid receptors mediate the sympathetic nervous system in the brain and elsewhere in the body. Some poison control centers recommend naloxone in the setting of clonidine overdose, including intravenous bolus doses of up to 10mg naloxone.

Preventing recreational opioid use
Naloxone is poorly absorbed when taken by mouth, so it is commonly combined with a number of oral opioid preparations, including buprenorphine and pentazocine, so that when taken by mouth, only the opioid has an effect. However, if the opioid and naloxone combination is injected, the naloxone blocks the effect of the opioid. This combination is used in an effort to prevent non-medical use.

Other uses

Naloxone can be used to treat opioid induced itchiness and constipation.

A 2003 meta-analysis of existing research showed naloxone to improve blood flow in patients with shock, including septic, cardiogenic, hemorrhagic, or spinal shock, but could not determine if this reduced patient deaths.

Naloxone has been used experimentally in the treatment of congenital insensitivity to pain with anhidrosis.

Special populations

Pregnancy and breastfeeding
Studies in rodents given a daily maximum dose of 10mg naloxone showed no harmful effects to the fetus, although human studies are lacking and the drug does cross the placenta, which may lead to the precipitation of withdrawal in the fetus. In this setting, further research is needed before safety can be assured, so naloxone should be used during pregnancy only if it is a medical necessity.

Whether naloxone is excreted in breast milk is unknown, however, it is not orally bioavailable and therefore is unlikely to affect a breastfeeding infant.

Children
Naloxone can be used on infants who were exposed to intrauterine opiates administered to mothers during delivery. However, there is insufficient evidence for the use of naloxone to lower cardiorespiratory and neurological depression in these infants. Infants exposed to high concentrations of opiates during pregnancy may have CNS damage in the setting of perinatal asphyxia. Naloxone has been studied to improve outcomes in this population, however the evidence is currently weak.

Intravenous, intramuscular, or subcutaneous administration of naloxone can be given to children and neonates to reverse opiate effects. The American Academy of Pediatrics recommends only intravenous administration as the other two forms can cause unpredictable absorption. After a dose is given, the child should be monitored for at least 24 hours. For children with low blood pressure due to septic shock, naloxone safety and effectiveness are not established.

Geriatric use
For patients 65 years and older, it is unclear if there is a difference in response. However, older people often have decreased liver and kidney function that may lead to an increased level of naloxone in their body.

Side effects
Naloxone has little to no effect if opioids are not present. In people with opioids in their system, it may cause increased sweating, nausea, restlessness, trembling, vomiting, flushing, and headache, and has in rare cases been associated with heart rhythm changes, seizures, and pulmonary edema.

Besides the side effects listed above, naloxone also has other adverse events, such as other cardiovascular effects (hypertension, hypotension, tachycardia, ventricular fibrillation, ventricular tachycardia) and central nervous system effects, such as agitation, body pain, brain disease, and coma. In addition to these adverse effects, naloxone is also contraindicated in people with hypersensitivity to naloxone or any of its formulation components.

Naloxone has been shown to block the action of pain-lowering endorphins the body produces naturally. These endorphins likely operate on the same opioid receptors that naloxone blocks. It is capable of blocking a placebo pain-lowering response, if the placebo is administered together with a hidden or blind injection of naloxone. Other studies have found that placebo alone can activate the body's μ-opioid endorphin system, delivering pain relief by the same receptor mechanism as morphine.

Naloxone should be used with caution in people with cardiovascular disease as well as those that are currently taking medications that could have adverse effects on the cardiovascular system such as causing low blood pressure, fluid accumulation in the lungs (pulmonary edema), and abnormal heart rhythms. There have been reports of abrupt reversals with opioid antagonists leading to pulmonary edema and ventricular fibrillation.

Pharmacology

Pharmacodynamics

Naloxone is a lipophilic compound that acts as a non-selective and competitive opioid receptor antagonist. The pharmacologically active isomer of naloxone is (−)-naloxone. Naloxone's binding affinity is highest for the μ-opioid receptor (MOR), then the δ-opioid receptor (DOR), and lowest for the κ-opioid receptor (KOR); naloxone has negligible affinity for the nociceptin receptor.

If naloxone is administered in the absence of concomitant opioid use, no functional pharmacological activity occurs, except the inability of the body to combat pain naturally. In contrast to direct opiate agonists, which elicit opiate withdrawal symptoms when discontinued in opiate-tolerant people, no evidence indicates the development of tolerance or dependence on naloxone. The mechanism of action is not completely understood, but studies suggest it functions to produce withdrawal symptoms by competing for opioid receptors within the brain (a competitive antagonist, not a direct agonist), thereby preventing the action of both endogenous and xenobiotic opioids on these receptors without directly producing any effects itself.

A single administration of naloxone at a relatively high dose of 2mg by intravenous injection has been found to produce brain MOR blockade of 80% at 5minutes, 47% at 2hours, 44% at 4hours, and 8% at 8hours. A low dose (2μg/kg) produced brain MOR blockade of 42% at 5minutes, 6% at 2hours, 33% at 4hours, and 10% at 8hours. Intranasal administration of naloxone via nasal spray has likewise been found to rapidly occupy brain MORs, with peak occupancy occurring at 20minutes, peak occupancies of 67% at a dose of 2mg and 85% with 4mg, and an estimated half-life of occupancy disappearance of approximately 100minutes (1.67hours).

Pharmacokinetics
When administered parenterally (non-orally or non-rectally, e.g., intravenously or by injection), as is most common, naloxone has a rapid distribution throughout the body. The mean serum half-life has been shown to range from 30 to 81 minutes, shorter than the average half-life of some opiates, necessitating repeat dosing if opioid receptors must be stopped from triggering for an extended period. Naloxone is primarily metabolized by the liver. Its major metabolite is naloxone-3-glucuronide, which is excreted in the urine. For people with liver diseases such as alcoholic liver disease or hepatitis, naloxone usage has not been shown to increase serum liver enzyme levels.

Naloxone has low systemic bioavailability when taken by mouth due to hepatic first-pass metabolism, but it does block opioid receptors that are located in the intestine.

Chemistry
Naloxone, also known as N-allylnoroxymorphone or as 17-allyl-4,5α-epoxy-3,14-dihydroxymorphinan-6-one, is a synthetic morphinan derivative and was derived from oxymorphone (14-hydroxydihydromorphinone), an opioid analgesic. Oxymorphone, in turn, was derived from morphine, an opioid analgesic and naturally occurring constituent of the opium poppy. Naloxone is a racemic mixture of two enantiomers, (–)-naloxone (levonaloxone) and (+)-naloxone (dextronaloxone), only the former of which is active at opioid receptors. The drug is highly lipophilic, allowing it to rapidly penetrate the brain and to achieve a far greater brain to serum ratio than that of morphine. Opioid antagonists related to naloxone include cyprodime, nalmefene, nalodeine, naloxol, and naltrexone.

The chemical half-life of naloxone is such that injection and nasal forms have been marketed with 24-month and 18-month shelf-lives, respectively.  A 2018 study noted that the nasal and injection forms presented as chemically stable to 36- and 28-months, respectively, which prompted an as yet incomplete five-year stability study to be initiated.  This suggests that expired caches of material in community and healthcare settings may still be efficacious substantially beyond their labeled expiration dates.

History
Naloxone was patented in 1961 by Mozes J. Lewenstein, Jack Fishman, and the company Sankyo. It was approved for opioid use disorder treatment in the United States in 1971, with opioid overdose prevention kits being distributed by many states to medically untrained people beginning in 1996. From the period of 1996 to 2014, the CDC estimates over 26,000 cases of opioid overdose have been reversed using the kits.

Naloxone (Nyxoid) was approved for use in the European Union in September 2017.

Society and culture

Names

The patent has expired and it is available as a generic medication. Several of the newer formulations use patented dispensers (spray mechanisms or autoinjectors), and patent disputes over generic forms of the nasal spray were litigated between 2016 and 2020, when a judge ruled in favor of Teva, the generic manufacturer.  Teva announced entry of the first generic nasal spray formulation in December 2021. Brand names of naloxone include Narcan, Kloxxado, Nalone, Evzio, Prenoxad Injection, Narcanti, Narcotan, and Zimhi, among others.

Identification
The CAS number of naloxone is 465-65-6; the anhydrous hydrochloride salt has CAS 357-08-4 and the hydrochloride salt with 2 molecules of water, hydrochloride dihydrate, has CAS 51481-60-8

Routes of administration

Intravenous
In hospital settings, naloxone is commonly injected intravenously, with an onset of 1–2 minutes and a duration of up to 45 minutes. While the onset is achieved fastest through IV than through other routes of administration, it may be difficult to obtain venous access in patients who use IV drugs chronically. This may be an issue under emergency conditions.

Intramuscular or subcutaneous
Naloxone can also be administered via intramuscular or subcutaneous injection. The onset of naloxone provided through this route is 2 to 5 minutes with a duration of around 30-120min. Naloxone administered intramuscularly are provided through pre-filled syringes, vials, and auto-injector. Evzio is the only auto-injector on the market and can be used both intramuscularly and subcutaneously. It is pocket-sized and can be used in non-medical settings such as in the home. It is designed for use by laypersons, including family members and caregivers of opioid users at-risk for an opioid emergency, such as an overdose. According to the FDA's National Drug Code Directory, a generic version of the auto-injector began to be marketed at the end of 2019.

Intranasal
Administration of naloxone intranasally is recommended for people who are unconscious or unresponsive. While the onset of action is slightly delayed in this method of administration, the ease of use and portability are what make naloxone nasal sprays useful. 

Narcan Nasal Spray was approved in 2015 and was the first FDA-approved nasal spray for emergency treatment or suspected overdose. Narcan Nasal Spray is prepackaged, requires no assembly, and delivers a consistent 4mg dose of naloxone. It was developed in a partnership between LightLake Therapeutics and the National Institute on Drug Abuse. The approval process was fast-tracked. A generic version of the nasal spray was approved in the United States in 2019, though did not come to market until 2021. 

In 2021, the FDA approved Kloxxado, a 8mg dose of intranasal naloxone developed by Hikma Pharmaceuticals. Citing the frequent need for multiple 4mg doses of Narcan to successfully reverse overdose, packs of Kloxxado Nasal Spray contain two pre-packaged nasal spray devices, each containing 8mg of naloxone.

However, a wedge device (nasal atomizer) can also be attached to a syringe that may also be used to create a mist to deliver the drug to the nasalmucosa. This is useful near facilities where many overdoses occur that already stock injectors.

Legal status and availability to law enforcement and emergency personnel

In the United States, naloxone is ostensibly available without a prescription in every state with the exception of Hawaii. In reality, not all pharmacies stock or dispense naloxone. Depending on the pharmacy, a pharmacist may have to write a prescription or not be able to give naloxone to comply with accounting rules, as naloxone is still considered a prescription-only medication under FDA rules.

As of mid-2019, officials in 29 states had issued standing orders to enable licensed pharmacists to provide naloxone to patients without the individual first visiting a prescriber. Prescribers working with harm reduction or low threshold treatment programs  have also issued standing orders to enable these organizations to distribute naloxone to their clients. A standing order, also referred to as a "non-patient specific prescription" is written by a physician, nurse or other prescriber to authorize medicine distribution outside the doctor-patient relationship. In the case of naloxone, these orders are meant to facilitate naloxone distribution to people using opioids, and their family members and friends.  Over 200 naloxone distribution programs utilize licensed prescribers to distribute the drug through such orders, or through the authority of pharmacists (as with California's legal proision, AB1535).

Laws and policies in many US jurisdictions have been changed to allow wider distribution of naloxone.  In addition to laws or regulations permitting distribution of medicine to at risk individuals and families, some 36 states have passed laws that provide naloxone prescribers with immunity against both civil and criminal liabilities. While paramedics in the US have carried naloxone for decades, law enforcement officers in many states throughout the country carry naloxone to reverse the effects of heroin overdoses when reaching the location before paramedics. As of 12 July 2015, law enforcement departments in 28 US states are allowed to or required to carry naloxone to quickly respond to opioid overdoses.  Programs training fire personnel in opioid overdose response using naloxone have also shown promise in the US, and efforts to integrate opioid fatality prevention into emergency response have grown due to the US overdose crisis.

Following the use of the nasal spray device by police officers on Staten Island in New York, an additional 20,000 police officers will begin carrying naloxone in mid-2014. The state's Office of the Attorney General will provide US$1.2 million to supply nearly 20,000 kits. Police Commissioner William Bratton said: "Naloxone gives individuals a second chance to get help". Emergency Medical Service Providers (EMS) routinely administer naloxone, except where basic Emergency Medical Technicians are prohibited by policy or by state law. In efforts to encourage citizens to seek help for possible opioid overdoses, many states have adopted Good Samaritan laws that provide immunity against certain criminal liabilities for anybody who, in good faith, seeks emergency medical care for either themselves or someone around them who may be experiencing an opioid overdose.

States including Vermont and Virginia have developed programs that mandate the prescription of naloxone when a prescription has exceeded a certain level of morphine milliequivalents per day as preventative measures against overdose. Healthcare institution-based naloxone prescription programs have also helped reduce rates of opioid overdose in North Carolina, and have been replicated in the US military.

In Canada, naloxone single-use syringe kits are distributed and available at various clinics and emergency rooms. Alberta Health Services is increasing the distribution points for naloxone kits at all emergency rooms, and various pharmacies and clinics province-wide. All Edmonton Police Service and Calgary Police Service patrol cars carry an emergency single-use naloxone syringe kit. Some Royal Canadian Mounted Police patrol vehicles also carry the drug, occasionally in excess to help distribute naloxone among users and concerned family/friends. Nurses, paramedics, medical technicians, and emergency medical responders can also prescribe and distribute the drug.  As of February 2016, pharmacies across Alberta and some other Canadian jurisdictions are allowed to distribute single-use take-home naloxone kits or prescribe the drug to people using opioids.

Following Alberta Health Services, Health Canada reviewed the prescription-only status of naloxone, resulting in plans to remove it in 2016, making naloxone more accessible. Due to the rising number of drug deaths across the country, Health Canada proposed a change to make naloxone more widely available to Canadians in support of efforts to address the growing number of opioid overdoses. In March 2016, Health Canada did change the prescription status of naloxone, as "pharmacies are now able to proactively give out naloxone to those who might experience or witness an opioid overdose."

Community access
In a survey of US laypersons in December 2021, most people believed the scientifically-supported idea that trained bystanders can reverse overdoses with naloxone.

A survey of US naloxone prescription programs in 2010 revealed that 21 out of 48 programs reported challenges in obtaining naloxone in the months leading up to the survey, due mainly to either cost increases that outstripped allocated funding or the suppliers' inability to fill orders. The approximate cost of a 1ml ampoule of naloxone in the US is estimated to be significantly higher than in most other countries.

Take-home naloxone programs for people who use opioids is under way in many North American cities. CDC estimates that the US programs for drug users and their caregivers prescribing take-home doses of naloxone and training on its use  prevented 10,000 opioid overdose deaths by 2014.

In Australia, as of 1 February 2016, some forms of naloxone are available "over the counter" in pharmacies without a prescription. It comes in single-use filled syringe similar to law enforcement kits. A single dose costs AU$20; for those with a prescription, five doses can bought for AU$40, amounting to a rate of eight dollars per dose (2019).

In Alberta, in addition to pharmacy distribution, take-home naloxone kits are available and commonly distributed in most drug treatment or rehabilitation centres.

In Europe, take home naloxone pilots were launched in the Channel Islands and in Berlin in the late 1990s.  In 2008, the Welsh Assembly government announced its intention to establish demonstration sites for take-home naloxone, and in 2010 Scotland instituted a national naloxone program.  Inspired by North American and European efforts, non-governmental organizations running programs to train drug users as overdose responders and supply them with naloxone are now operational in Russia, Ukraine, Georgia, Kazakhstan, Tajikistan, Afghanistan, China, Vietnam, and Thailand.  Noting the high risk of overdose among people with HIV who inject drugs, international HIV donors including the President's Emergency Plan for AIDS Relief, the Global Fund to Fight AIDS, Tuberculosis and Malaria, and the Open Society Foundations, have supported the purchase and distribution of naloxone to those at risk in low- and middle income countries.

In 2017, Next Harm Reduction in New York State began distributing naloxone and other harm reduction supplies by mail to those in the US unable to get them locally.

In 2018, a maker of naloxone announced it would provide a free kit including two doses of the nasal spray, as well as educational materials, to each of the 16,568 public libraries and 2,700 YMCAs in the U.S.

Media
The 2013 documentary film Reach for Me: Fighting to End the American Drug Overdose Epidemic interviews people involved in naloxone programs aiming to make naloxone available to opioid users and people with chronic pain.

Criticism
Some political commentators, law enforcement workers, and addiction specialists have argued naloxone enables opioid addiction and worsens the crisis. Some police officers report reviving the same addict multiple times and that the availability of naloxone have allowed some addicts to push their use over the edge.  Other critics have noted Narcan nasal spray's American manufacturer views colleges, schools, libraries, and community centers as "untapped markets" and a "growth opportunity." Narcan's manufacturer also charges $150 for the nasal spray and aggressively sues competitors looking to market a cheaper unauthorized generic version of the drug. The public relations effort to raise awareness of naloxone and promote policies such as bulk purchases by police departments obviously increases sales.

References

Further reading

External links 
 
 
 
 
 

Allylamines
Antidotes
Chemical substances for emergency medicine
4,5-Epoxymorphinans
GABAA receptor negative allosteric modulators
Kappa-opioid receptor antagonists
Ketones
Mu-opioid receptor antagonists
Phenol ethers
Sigma antagonists
Tertiary alcohols
Wikipedia medicine articles ready to translate
World Health Organization essential medicines